Wojskowa Komenda Uzupełnień (WKU, translated variously as Army Recruiting Command or Military Replenishment Council) is a unit of military administration in Poland, dealing with military draft. It is subordinate to the local representatives of Ministry of National Defence.

References

External links
 Lists of WKU units in Poland

Military of Poland